Díðrikur á Skarvanesi also called Díðrikur í Kárastovu (25 July 1802 – 8 October 1865), was born in Dímun and was the first known painter in the Faroe Islands that art historians know of.

Díðrikiur á Skarvanesi was a bird painter. He was self-taught, the only kind of art education he had was when he went on a study tour to Copenhagen in 1828. Only five of his paintings have been preserved.  His work is on permanent exhibition at the Listasavn Føroya (Faroe Islands Art Museum).

References

1802 births
1865 deaths
People from Skúvoy Municipality
Faroese painters
19th-century painters